The 2014–15 ACB season was the 32nd season of the Spanish basketball league, also called Liga Endesa in its sponsored identity. The regular season started on 4 October 2014 and finished on 24 May 2015. The playoffs, joined by the eight first qualified teams, was played between 28 May and 24 June 2015.

Teams

Promotion and relegation (pre-season)
A total of 18 teams contested the league, including 16 sides from the 2013–14 season and two promoted from the 2013–14 LEB Oro. Bilbao Basket was initially excluded from the league but on 8 August, the ACB was forced to re-admit Bilbao.
Teams promoted from LEB Oro
MoraBanc Andorra
Ford Burgos (did not fulfill the requirements, its place was offered La Bruixa d'Or Manresa)

Venues and locations

Personnel and sponsorship

Notes
1. ACB did not process the license of Scott Roth, head coach of Sevilla until January 2015, but he managed the team with the license of Audie Norris, who appeared officially as head coach.
2. Cultura del Esfuerzo is the motto of the club.

Managerial changes

Season summary

Bilbao Basket v Laboral Kutxa Baskonia brawl
On March 1, 2015, the Basque basketball derby between Bilbao Basket and Laboral Kutxa Baskonia at Bilbao Arena finished with a brawl where Dejan Todorović of Bilbao and Tornike Shengelia of Baskonia were disqualified and twelve players were ejected due to court invasion during the fight.

With four seconds left, despite the referee's call for a travelling, Todorović was going to dunk when he was hit by Shengelia. After this, the Montenegrin player pushed Shengelia from behind and the Georgian forward reacted with a punch. After this, all the players who were on the bench came into the court and started the brawl. When Shengelia was leaving the court after the disqualifying foul, he apologized to a child who was in the first row of the arena.

The ACB announced this brawl would have severe consequences and sanctions and would talk with the Spanish Basketball Federation for changing the disciplinary regulations. On March 5, the league provisionally suspended Todorović and Shengelia until the final resolution of the case.

After knowing the notice, both clubs claimed to have the same sanctions than in 2004, when the brawl Real Madrid and Estudiantes occurred. Finally, on March 11, the Disciplinary Judge accorded to suspend Tornike Shengelia for five games, Dejan Todorović for four and a €3,000 fine to Bilbao Basket player Dairis Bertāns and to Baskonia brothers Mamadou and Ilimane Diop.

Regular season

League table

Positions by round
The table lists the positions of teams after completion of each round.
<div style="overflow:auto">

Results

Playoffs

Final standings

Attendances
Attendances include playoff games:

Statistics

| width=50% valign=top |

Rebounds

|}
|}

| width=50% valign=top |

Performance Index Rating

|}
|}Source: ACB

Season highs

Awards
All official awards of the 2014–15 ACB season.

MVP
 Felipe Reyes (Real Madrid)

Finals MVP
 Sergio Llull (Real Madrid)

All-ACB Team

Best Young Player Award
  Dani Díez – Gipuzkoa Basket

Best All-Young Team

Player of the week
Since this season, only players whose team wins are eligible for this award.

Player of the month 
The players with more PIR per game in the month wins this award.

References

External links
 ACB.com 
 linguasport.com 

 
Liga ACB seasons

 
Spain